Mills is an unincorporated community located in Knox County, Kentucky, United States.

A post office was established in 1891 by Isaac Mills and named for his family.  The post office is now closed.

References

Unincorporated communities in Knox County, Kentucky
Unincorporated communities in Kentucky